On 16 August 2020, al-Shabaab killed 11 or 12 people at the Elite Hotel in Mogadishu, Somalia.

Background
The Somali Civil War began in 1991. Al-Shabaab are a jihadist group who began an insurgency in the country in 2008, since when they have frequently carried out attacks there. The most common location of their attacks is the capital Mogadishu, and hotels are one of their favoured types of target. Less often, they attack Kenya and Uganda. They control part of southern Somalia and are trying to take over the whole country and implement a severe version of Sharia law.

Attack
On 16 August 2020, al-Shabaab detonated a car bomb at the recently-built high-end Elite Hotel in Lido Beach in the Somali capital Mogadishu. They then opened fire using assault rifles. A siege lasted four hours, until all five insurgents were killed by Somali special forces; at least 43 people were injured.

See also
List of terrorist incidents in 2020
2020 in Somalia

References

2020 mass shootings in Africa
2020 murders in Somalia
2020s building bombings
2020 hotel attack
21st-century mass murder in Somalia
2020 hotel attack
Attacks on buildings and structures in 2020
2020 hotel attack
Attacks on hotels in Somalia
August 2020 crimes in Africa
Building bombings in Somalia
Car and truck bombings in Somalia
Car and truck bombings in the 2020s
Hotel bombings
Improvised explosive device bombings in 2020
2020 hotel attack
Mass murder in 2020
2020 hotel attack
Mass shootings in Somalia
Terrorist incidents in Somalia in 2020